Hanham Woods Academy (formerly Hanham High School) is an 11–16 mixed, secondary school with academy status in Hanham, Gloucestershire, England. It was formerly a community school and adopted its present name after becoming an academy in 2014. It is part of the Cabot Learning Federation.

Notable alumni 
Hanham High School
 Stephen Merchant, writer, director, radio presenter, comedian and actor
Marsha de Cordova, politician, Member of Parliament for Battersea, and Shadow Secretary of State for Women and Equalities
Larry Godfrey, British Olympic archer
Andy Uren,  Bristol Bears professional rugby player

References

External links 
 

Secondary schools in South Gloucestershire District
Academies in South Gloucestershire District